Cameraria trizosterata is a moth of the family Gracillariidae. It is known from Selangor, Malaysia.

The larvae feed on Bauhinia species. They mine the leaves of their host plant.

References

Cameraria (moth)

Leaf miners
Moths of Malaysia
Moths described in 1993
Taxa named by Tosio Kumata